The Smoke-free Environments Amendment Bill was passed by the Parliament of New Zealand on 3 December 2003. The smoking ban legislation calls for progressive introduction of various clauses to totally ban smoking in all workplaces including offices, clubs, pubs, restaurants, airports, schools etc., within a year of that date.

Legislative history
The bill was introduced privately by Labour Member of Parliament Steve Chadwick, who said the intention was to improve health throughout the country. Chadwick's main claim was that the bill would save the lives of about 388 New Zealanders a year who would otherwise have died from inhaling second hand smoke. She said it would reduce allied disabilities and hospital admissions, as well as discourage non-smokers from becoming smokers. MPs had a conscience vote on the issue, deciding 68–52 in favour of the bill.

Enforcement
The first successful prosecution under the Smokefree Environments Amendment Act came in December 2005 at the Timaru District Court. The defendant, Geoff Mulvihill, received a NZ$9,000 fine (and $6000 in costs) for failing to enforce the legislation in his tavern.

Legacy
One year after the act was passed, the Asthma and Respiratory Foundation released a report showing that there has been no reduction in the number of bar patrons or bar takings. There has been an increase in the number of non-smokers at bars and cafes. Rural pubs may have suffered a loss of patronage.

See also
Tobacco in New Zealand

References

External links
Full text of the Act
Ministry of Health explanation of the law

Statutes of New Zealand
Tobacco control
2003 in New Zealand law
Smoking in New Zealand